Nightlife are a barbershop quartet that won the BHS International Quartet competition in 1996.

Members
Tenor: Rob Menaker
Lead: John Sasine
Baritone: Jeff Baker
Bass: Brett Littlefield

Nightlife is a barbershop quartet and winner of the 1996 International Championship from the Society for the Preservation and Encouragement of Barbershop Quartet Singing in America, Inc.

Starting from similar roots that flourished in the five-time world champion men's chorus, the Masters of Harmony, Nightlife is only the second international quartet champion in barbershop history to win gold alongside its parent chorus, which attained the same triumph on the same stage in the same year.

Since then, Nightlife has traveled all over America and abroad from our home base in Los Angeles, California, entertaining thousands with a broad selection of musical arrangements, mainly in the wonderful barbershop style.

References

External links 
 AIC entry, archived version (with more information)

Barbershop quartets
Barbershop Harmony Society